Meols Cop is a small area within the Blowick suburb, in the coastal town of Southport, Merseyside in north-western England. It is not a suburb or ward in its own right. It is not to be confused with Meols on the Wirral Peninsula.  The two can be differentiated by pronunciation — Meols Cop is pronounced Meels, but Meols, Wirral is pronounced Mells.

The area is served by station of the same name with trains to Southport railway station or Wigan Wallgate railway station and beyond. Meols Cop railway station opened on 2 September 1887, and served both lines. The line from Butts Lane Junction to  closed on 26 September 1938, but the line through Meols Cop is still open today. Meols Cop railway station remained open and is served by Wigan and Southport trains today; goods train services were however withdrawn on 27 November 1967.

Towns and villages in the Metropolitan Borough of Sefton
Southport